Riverport may refer to:

Inland port
Riverport, Nova Scotia
Jefferson Riverport International
Riverport Amphitheater
 Riverport riot